Laxminarayan Nayak (1918 – 30 November 2019) was an Indian politician from Madhya Pradesh. He was a member of the Lok Sabha and Madhya Pradesh Legislative Assembly.

Biography
Nayak was born in 1918 at Nimchauni in Tikmagarh. He was a freedom fighter. During the Indian freedom struggle, he was imprisoned several times.

Nayak was elected as a member of Madhya Pradesh Legislative Assembly from Niwari in 1957 as a Praja Socialist Party candidate. He was elected again from this constituency in 1972 as a Samyukta Socialist Party candidate. He was elected as a member of Lok Sabha from Khajuraho in 1977 as a Janata Party candidate.

Nayak died on 30 November 2019 in Niwari at the age of 101.

References

1918 births
Lok Sabha members from Madhya Pradesh
2019 deaths
Madhya Pradesh MLAs 1957–1962
Madhya Pradesh MLAs 1972–1977
Praja Socialist Party politicians
Janata Party politicians
People from Tikamgarh district
Indian centenarians
Men centenarians
India MPs 1977–1979
People from Niwari district